Daniel Hansen Ludlow (March 17, 1924 – February 14, 2009) was a professor of religion at Brigham Young University (BYU) in Provo, Utah.  He was also the chief editor of the Encyclopedia of Mormonism, published in 1992 by Macmillan.

Biography 
Ludlow was raised in southern Utah County and attended public schools in such communities as Benjamin, Utah, Goshen, Utah and Spanish Fork.  He studied at Utah State University where he served for two years as student body president.  He then went on to receive an M.A. in education from Indiana University and a Ph.D. from Columbia University.

In 1947, Ludlow published Latter-day Prophets Speak, a compilation of the teachings of various leaders of the Church of Jesus Christ of Latter-day Saints (LDS Church). Ludlow joined BYU's faculty in 1955.  He served for a time as the dean of Religious Education at BYU. In 1968, Ludlow headed the group of BYU students who were the first to go to the Holy Land under BYU auspices.

By 1972, Ludlow had left BYU and had become the director of teacher support services for the Church Educational System of the LDS Church.  Ludlow was also one of the leading specialists in assisting Thomas S. Monson, Boyd K. Packer and Bruce R. McConkie in preparing the LDS Church editions of the Standard Works that were released from 1979 to 1981.  During part of the 1980s, he served as director of Correlation Review for the LDS Church.  Ludlow also served as a Sunday School teacher, as a branch president, as a member of a bishopric, in high councils and stake presidencies, as a regional representative of the Twelve, as president of Australia Perth Mission, and as a temple worker.

Ludlow and his wife Luene had one son, Victor L. Ludlow and eight daughters.

On February 14, 2009 Ludlow died of causes incident to age.

Publications 
Ludlow wrote several books of commentary on the scriptures, particularly the Book of Mormon and Doctrine and Covenants.  He and his wife jointly wrote some articles for the LDS Church's New Era magazine in the early 1980s.

Notes

References
Hunter, Milton R., "Forward" in Daniel H. Ludlow, Latter-day Prophets (Salt Lake City: Bookcraft, 1948) pp. vii–viii. 
.

External links
Deseret Book: Daniel H. Ludlow
Daniel H. Ludlow, “Of the House of Israel,” Ensign, January 1991, p. 51
Daniel H. Ludlow papers, MSS 8007 at L. Tom Perry Special Collections, Brigham Young University

1924 births
2009 deaths
20th-century Mormon missionaries
American encyclopedists
American Latter Day Saint writers
American Mormon missionaries in Australia
Brigham Young University faculty
Columbia University alumni
Editors of Latter Day Saint publications
Indiana University alumni
Mission presidents (LDS Church)
Writers from Provo, Utah
Regional representatives of the Twelve
Utah State University alumni
Latter Day Saints from Utah